The Best FIFA Football Coach is an association football award given annually to the men's and women's football coaches who are considered to have performed the best in the previous 12 months.

History
The selection criteria for the coaches of the year is: performance and general behaviour of their teams on and off the pitch.

The votes are decided by media representatives, national team coaches, and national team captains. In October 2016, it was announced that the general public would also be allowed to vote. Each group gets 25% of the overall vote.

The Best FIFA Men's Coach Award winners

Overall total

The Best FIFA Women's Coach Award winners

Overall total

See also

 List of sports awards honoring women
 The Best FIFA Football Awards
 FIFA World Coach of the Year (2010–2015)
 European Coach of the Year
 European Coach of the Season

References

External links

The Best FIFA Football Awards
 
Awards established in 2016
Women's association football trophies and awards